This is a list of films that featured the World Trade Center (1973–2001) in New York City. Most are prior to its destruction as a result of the September 11 attacks, but some additionally feature the new World Trade Center (see One World Trade Center in popular culture for the new One World Trade Center in film).

Alphabetical

0–9
The 10th Kingdom (2000)
15 Minutes (2001)
2:22 (2017)
200 Cigarettes (1999)
28 Days (2000)
29th Street (1991)
3 A.M. (2001)
30 Years to Life (2001)
The 4th Floor (1999)
54 (1998)
9/11 (2002)

A
Across the Sea of Time (1995)
Adam & Steve (2005)
Addicted to Love (1997)
The Adventures of Rocky and Bullwinkle (2000)
Aftershock: Earthquake in New York (1999)
Alien Contamination (1980)
All 4 the Money (2002)
All I Want For Christmas (1991)
All Over Me (1997)
All the Vermeers in New York (1990)
All You Need Is Cash (1978)
Alligator Eyes (1990)
Alphabet City (1984)
The Ambulance (1990)
The American Friend (1977)
American Pie 2 (2001)
American Pop (1981)
American Psycho (2000)
Analyze This (1999)
Anarchism in America (1983)
Angie (1994)
Antz (1998)
Any Which Way You Can (1980)
Arizona Dream (1993)
Armageddon (1998)
The Art of War (2000)
A.I. Artificial Intelligence (2001)
As Good as It Gets (1997)
Assassination Tango (2002)
The Associate (1996)
The Astronaut's Wife (1999)
At First Sight (1999)
August (2008)
Author! Author! (1982)
Autumn in New York (2000)
An American Pickle (2020)
An Autumn's Tale (1987)

B
Babe: Pig in the City (1998) 
Badge 373 (1973)
Bait (2000)
Barney's Version (2010)
Basket Case (1982)
Basketball Diaries (1995)
Beat Street (1984)
A Beautiful Day in the Neighborhood (2019)
Bed of Roses (1996)
Bedazzled (2000)
Before Night Falls (2000)
Being John Malkovich (1999)
The Believers 
Best Seller (1987)
Betsy's Wedding (1990)
Beyond Justice (1992)
Bicentennial Man (1999)
The Big Blue (1988)
Big Business (1988)
Big Daddy (1999)
Big Money Hustlas (2000)
The Bitch (1979)
Black and White (1999)
Black Cobra (1987)
Black Rain (1989)
Blackout (1978)
Bless the Child (2000)
Bobby G. Can't Swim (1999)
Body Rock (1984)
Boiler Room (2000)
The Bone Collector (1999)
The Bonfire of the Vanities (1990)
The Book of Life (1998)
Bookwars (2000)
Boomerang (1992)
Born in Flames (1983)
Borough of Kings (2000)
Boss of Bosses (2001)
Bowling for Columbine (2002)
The Box (2009)
Boys on the Side (1995)
Brain Damage (1988)
Breeders (1986)
Brewster's Millions (1985)
Bright Lights, Big City (1988)
Broadway Danny Rose (1984)
The Bronx Executioner (1989)
Bronx Warriors (1982)
Bronx Warriors 2 (1983)
Brooklyn Bridge (1981)
A Brooklyn State of Mind (1997)
Brooklyn's Finest (2009)
The Brother from Another Planet (1984)
The Brothers McMullen (1995)
Brown Sugar (2002)
Bullet (1996)
Burning Blue (2013)
Burnzy's Last Call (1995)
The Butcher's Wife (1991)
Buying the Cow (2002)
Bye Bye Monkey (1978)

C
Call Me (1988)
Cannibal Ferox (1981)
Cannibal Holocaust (1980)
Car 54, Where Are You? (1994)
Casino Jack (2010)
The Cathedral (2021)
Cat's Eye (1985)
Caught (1996)
Center Stage (2000)
Changing Lanes (2002)
Chapter 27 (2007)
Chasing Amy (1997)
The Children of Times Square (1986)
A Chorus Line (1985)
C.H.U.D. (1984)
Citizen Toxie: The Toxic Avenger IV (2000)
City Hall (1996)
City by the Sea (2002)
City Slickers (1991)
Class of Nuke 'Em High (1986)
Clockers (1995)
Cocktail (1988)
The Collectors (1999)
Coming Soon (1999)
Coming to America (1988)
Commandments (1997)
Communion (1989)
Coneheads (1993)
The Confession (1999)
Contamination (1980)
Conspiracy Theory (1997)
Cookie (1989)
Cop Land (1997)
Corky Romano (2001)
The Corruptor (1999)
The Cowboy Way (1994)
Coyote Ugly (2000)
Crazy Joe (1974)
Crazy Little Thing (2002)
Crazy People (1990)
Creating Rem Lezar (1989)
Critical Condition (1987)
Crocodile Dundee (1986)
Crocodile Dundee II (1988)
Crossroads (1986)
Cruel Intentions (1999)
Cruel Intentions 2 (2000)
The Cruise (1998)

D 
David Searching (1997)
A Day in Black and White (1999)
Daybreak (1993)
Daylight (1996)
The Daytrippers (1996)
DC 9/11:Time of Crisis (2003)
Dear John (2010)
Death by Design (1997)
Death to Smoochy (2002)
Death Wish (1974)
Death Wish 3 (1985)
Deceived (1991)
Deep Impact (1998)
Defiance (1980)
Definitely, Maybe (2008)
Delirious (1991)
Delivering Milo (2001)
The Devil and Daniel Johnston (2005)
The Devil's Advocate (1997)
The Devil's Own (1997)
Die Hard with a Vengeance (1995)
Diverted (2009)
Dog Day Afternoon (1975)
Donnie Brasco (1997)
Don't Say a Word (2001)
Double Platinum (1999)
Double Take (2001)
Down to You (2000)
The Dream Team (1989)
Dressed to Kill (1980)

E
Earthquake in New York (TV movie 1998)
Eat and Run (1986)
Eaten Alive (1980)
Eddie (1996)
Election (1999)
Emanuelle and the Last Cannibals (1977)
Emanuelle Around the World (1977)
Emanuelle in America (1976)
Empire (2002)
End of the Century: The Story of the Ramones (2003)
End of Days (1999)
Enemy Territory (1987)
Entrapment (1999)
Entropy (1999)
Eraser (1996)
Escape From New York (1981)
Evidence of Blood (1998)
Exorcist II: The Heretic (1977)
The Experts (1989)
Exposed (1983)
The Exterminator (1980)
Extremely Loud & Incredibly Close (2011)
Eye of the Beholder (1999)
Eyes of Laura Mars (1978)

F
Fahrenheit 9/11 (2004)Fair Game (2010)Family Enforcer (1976)The Family Man (2000)Fast Food Fast Women (2000)Fear City (1984)Fever (1999)A Few Days in September (2006)Fight For Your Life (1977)Final Destination 3 (2006)Fingers (1978)Flight 93 (2006)A Fool and His Money (1989)Fools Rush In (1997)For Love of the Game (1999)For Love or Money (1993)For Pete's Sake (1974)For Richer or Poorer (1997)Forces of Nature (1999)Four Dogs Playing Poker (2000)Frankenhooker (1990)Frankie and Johnny (1991)Freejack (1992)Freestyle: The Art of Rhyme (2000)The French Connection (1971)Fresh (1994)Fresh Kill (1994)The Freshman (1990)Friday the 13th Part VIII: Jason Takes Manhattan (1989)Full Disclosure (2001)Funny About Love (1990)A Further Gesture (1997)F/X (1986)F/X2 (1991)

GThe Gang That Couldn't Shoot Straight (1971)Gangs of New York (2002)GasLand (2010)Get Well Soon (2001)Ghostbusters (1984)Ghostbusters II (1989)Girlfight (2000)Giving It Up (1999)Glitter (2001)The Godfather Part III (1990)The Godson (1998)Godspell (1973)Godzilla (1998)Going in Style (1979)Going Nomad (1998)Gonzo: The Life and Work of Dr. Hunter S. Thompson (2008)Good Advice (2001)Gotham (1988)Gotti (1996)Great Expectations (1998)Green Ice (1981)Gremlins 2: The New Batch (1990)The Groove Tube (1974)The Gumball Rally (1976)Gun Shy (2000)The Guru (2002)Gypsy 83 (2001)

HHackers (1995)Half Baked (1998)The Hamburg Cell (2004)Hangmen (1987)The Hard Way (1991)Harrison's Flowers (2000)Harry and Tonto (1974)He Got Game (1998)Heartbreakers (2001)Heavy Metal (1981)Hello Again (1987)Hellraiser III: Hell on Earth (1992)High Wire (1984)Highlander (1986)Highlander: Endgame (2000)Home Alone 2: Lost in New York (1992)The Hot Rock (1972)The House by the Cemetery (1981)The House on the Edge of the Park (1980)Hudson Hawk (1991)The Hunger (1983)

II, the Jury (1982)I Love N.Y. (1987)I Spit on Your Grave (1978)If Lucy Fell (1996)Igby Goes Down (2002)I'll Take You There (1999)I'm Not Rappaport (1996)Imagine: John Lennon (1988)In the Soup (1992)Independence Day (1996)The Indian in the Cupboard (1995)Inside Man (2006)Interiors (1978)The Intern (2000)The Irishman (2019)Island of the Dead (2000)It (1990)It Could Happen to You (1994)It Might Get Loud (2008)It Takes Two (1995)It's a Very Merry Muppet Christmas Movie (2002)

JJack and the Beanstalk: The Real Story (2001)Jacob's Ladder (1990)Jane Austen in Manhattan (1980)The January Man (1989)Jeans (1998)Jeffrey (1995)The Jerky Boys: The Movie (1995)Jersey Girl (1992)Joe's Apartment (1996)Josie and the Pussycats (2001)Jumpin' Jack Flash (1986)Jungle 2 Jungle (1997)Just Another Girl on the I.R.T. (1992)Just the Ticket (1999)

KKeeping the Faith (2000)The Kentucky Fried Movie (1977)Kids (1995)Kill the Irishman (2011)Kill the Poor (2006)The Killing Fields (1984)The Killing of John Lennon (2006)King Kong (1976)The Kingdom (2007)Kiss Me Guido (1997)The Kissing Place (1990)Klute (1971)Knockaround Guys (2001)Knowing (2009)Kramer vs Kramer (1979)Krush Groove (1985)Kal Ho Nah Ho (2003)

LLabor Pains (2000)Lady Liberty (1972)The Last Days of Disco (1998)The Last Seduction (1994)Law and Disorder (1974)Laws of Gravity (1992)Left Behind (2000)Legal Eagles (1986)Léon: The Professional (1994)Les Aventures de Rabbi Jacob (1973)Lesser Prophets (1997)Let My Puppets Come (1976)Liberty Kid (2007)Lightning Over Water (1980)The Linguini Incident (1991)Lionheart (1990)Little Big League (1994)Live and Let Die (1973)Living Out Loud (1998)The Lonely Guy (1984)Lonely in America (1991)Longshot (2000)Longtime Companion (1989)Look Who's Talking (1989)Lookin' Italian (1998)Loser (2000)Lost in New York (1989)Lotto Land (1995)Love Affair (1994)Love the Hard Way (2001)Love Jones (1997)Love or Money (1990)Loving (1970)Lowball (1997)

MThe Mad Adventures of 'Rabbi' Jacob (1973)Madagascar: Escape 2 Africa (2008)Made (2001)Made for Each Other (1971)The Maid (1991)Man On Wire (2008)Manhattan (1979)Manhattan Baby (1982)The Manhattan Dating Project (2001)Manhattan Merengue (1995)Maniac (1980)Maniac Cop (1988)Maniac Cop 2 (1990)Maniac Cop 3 (1993)Mao's Last Dancer (2009)Marathon Man (1976)Married to the Mob (1988)Mars Attacks! (1996)Mary and Max (2009)Mary and Rhoda (2000)The Matrix (1999)Maximum Risk (1996)Maze (2000)Mazes and Monsters (1982)Mean Streets (1973)Meat Loaf: To Hell and Back (2000)Meet Joe Black (1998)Meet Prince Charming (1999)Memories of Me (1988)Men in Black (1997)Mercy (1995)Meteor (1979)Metropolitan (1990)Mickey Blue Eyes (1999)Mimic 2 (2001)The Minion (1998)Miracle (2004)Miracle on 34th Street (1994)The Mirror Has Two Faces (1996)The Misadventures of Margaret (1998)Miss Congeniality (2000)Mixed Blood (1985)Mo' Better Blues (1990)Mob War (1989)Model Behavior (2000)A Modern Affair (1996)Modern Problems (1981)The Money Pit (1986)Money Train (1995)Moonstruck (1987)Mortal Kombat: Annihilation (1997)Mortal Thoughts (1991)Moscow on the Hudson (1984)A Most Deadly Family (2001)A Most Violent Year (2014)Mr. Billion (1977)Mr. Deeds (2002)Mr. Saturday Night (1992)Mr. Wonderful (1993)Munich (2005)My Demon Lover (1987)My Giant (1998)

NNadja (1994)Naked in New York (1993)Naked States (2000)Naqoyqatsi (2002)Necropolis (1987)Network (1976)New Jack City (1991)A New Life (1988) New York (2009)New York Cop (1993)New York Nights (1984)New York Ninja (2021)The New York Ripper (1982)New York Stories (1989)News from Home (1977)Nick and Jane (1997)Nick Fury: Agent of S.H.I.E.L.D. (1998)Night and the City (1992)Night Falls on Manhattan (1997)Night on Earth (1991)Night Owl (1993)Night Shift (1982)Nighthawks (1981)Nothing But Trouble (1991)Notorious (2009)Nuts (1987)A Nymphoid Barbarian in Dinosaur Hell (1990)

OThe Object of My Affection (1998)Old Enough (1984)Oldboy (2003)Oliver & Company (1988)The Omen (2006)On Line (2002)On the Basis of Sex (2018)On the Run (1999)Once in the Life (2000)One Eight Seven (1997)One Fine Day (1996)One More Kiss (1999)One Night Stand (1997)One Tough Cop (1998)Open Season (1995)Operation Delta Force 3: Clear Target (1999)The Order (2001)The Other End of the Line (2008)Other People's Money (1991) Other Voices (2000)The Out-of-Towners (1999)Over the Brooklyn Bridge (1984)Overboard (1987)Oxygen (1999)

PPact with the Devil (2003)The Paper (1994)Paradise Not Yet Lost (also known as Oona's Third Year) (1979)Parallel Lines (2004)Paris Is Burning (1990)Passion of Mind (2000)Paternity (1981)Path to Paradise: The Untold Story of the World Trade Center Bombing (1997)Payback (2021)The Peacemaker (1997)People I Know (2002)A Perfect Murder (1998)Perfume (2001)Permanent Vacation (1980)The Phantom of the Opera (1989)The Photographer (2000)The Pickle (1993)Picture Perfect (1997)Playing by Heart (1998)Police Academy 4: Citizens on Patrol (1987)A Policewoman in New York (1981)The Pope of Greenwich Village (1984)Popeye Doyle (1986)Postal (2007)Power (1986)Pretty Woman (1990)Prince of Central Park (2000)Prizzi's Honor (1985)The Protector (1985)Protocols of Zion (2005)Punisher: War Zone (2008)Pushing Tin (1999)

QQ (1982)Queens Logic (1991)Quiet Cool (1986)

RRage of Angels (1983)Raise the Titanic (1980)Ready to Rumble (2000)The Real Blonde (1997)The Reflecting Pool (2008)Remember Me (2010)Remo Williams: The Adventure Begins (1985)Rent (2005)Restaurant (1998)Return to Paradise (1998)Return of Superfly (1990)Rhinestone (1984)Roadie (1980)Rob the Mob (2014)Robot Holocaust (1987)Rocketman (2019) 
Rollin (Air Raid Vehicle) (2000)Rollover (1981)Romeo is Bleeding (1993)Rooftops (1989)Rounders (1998)Rudy (1993)Rumble in the Bronx (1996)Run for Cover (1995)Runaway Bride (1999)Running (1979)The Rutles: All You Need Is Cash (1978)

SThe Saint of Fort Washington (1993)Santa Claus: The Movie (1985)Sam the Man (2000)Saturday Night Fever (1977)Savage Attack (1988)Scent of a Woman (1992)Sea of Love (1989)Search and Destroy (1995)Searching for Bobby Fischer (1993)The Secret of My Success (1987)See No Evil, Hear No Evil (1989)Senior Trip (1981)Sensational Cities: New York (2000)The Sentinel (1977)Serpico (1973)Sex and the Other Man (1995)Sgt. Kabukiman N.Y.P.D. (1991)Shades of Gray (1992)Shaft (2000)The Shaft (2001)Shakedown (1988)Shamus (1973)She-Devil (1989)She's the One (1996)Sid and Nancy (1986)Sidewalks of New York (2001)The Siege (1998)Simply Irresistible (1999)Sisters (1973)Six Degrees of Separation (1993)Six Weeks (1982)Slaves of New York (1989)Sleepless in Seattle (1993)The Sleepy Time Gal (2001)A Slight Case of Murder (1999)Smoke (1995)Smokin' Aces 2 (2010)Snatch (2000)The Soldier (1982)Someone Else's America (1995)Someone Like You (2001)Someone to Watch Over Me (1987)Something Short of Paradise (1979)Something Wild (1986)The Song Remains the Same (1976)Sorority House Massacre (1986)Sorry, Haters (2005)Spike of Bensonhurst (1988)Spider-Man (2002)Spider-Man: The Dragon's Challenge (1981)Splash (1984)Split Decisions (1988)The Squeeze (1987)Stag (1997)Startup.com (2001)State of Grace (1990)The Statue of Liberty (1985)Staying Alive (1983)Stella (1990)Stepmom (1998)Stir Crazy (1980)Stone Cold Dead (1979)Story of a Junkie (1987)Storytelling (2001)Straight Out of Brooklyn (1991)A Stranger Among Us (1992)The Strangers in 7A (1972)Strays (1997)Street Hunter (1990)Strictly Business (1991)Stroszek (1977)Stuart Little (1999)The Stuff (1985)The Substitute 2: School's Out (1998)The Suburbans (1999)Sugar Hill (1994)Sunday (1997)The Sunshine Boys (1996)Super Mario Bros. (1993)Supergirl (1984)Superman (1978)Superman II (1980)Superman II: The Richard Donner Cut (2006)Superman III (1983)Superman IV: The Quest for Peace (1987)The Survivors (1983)Switch (1991)

TThe Taking of Pelham 123 (1974)Taxi Driver (1976)Teenage Mutant Ninja Turtles (1990)Teenage Mutant Ninja Turtles II: The Secret of the Ooze (1991)Teenage Mutant Ninja Turtles III (1993)Tempest (1982)Terms of Endearment (1983)Terror Firmer (1999)That Old Feeling (1997)They All Laughed (1981)The Thing Called Love (1993)Thirteen Conversations About One Thing (2001)The Thomas Crown Affair (1999)Three Days of the Condor (1975)Three The Hard Way (1974)Three of Hearts (1993)Tiger Cruise (2004)Too Scared to Scream (1985)Town & Country (2001)The Toxic Avenger (1985)The Toxic Avenger Part II (1989)The Toxic Avenger Part III (1989)Toys (1992)Trading Places (1983)Tribute (1980)Trick (1999)A Troll in Central Park (1994)Tromeo and Juliet (1996)True Believer (1989)True Blood (1989)Turbulence (1997)Turk 182 (1985)The Turning Point (1977)Two of a Kind (1983)

UThe Ultimate Warrior (1975)An Unmarried Woman (1978)Up the Sandbox (1972)U.S. Marshals (1998)Us (2019)The Usual Suspects (1995)United 93 (2006)

VThe Valachi Papers (1972)Vampire in Brooklyn (1995)Vampire's Kiss (1989)Vanilla Sky (2001)The Velocity of Gary (1998)Vigilante (1982)Virgil Bliss (2001)The Visitor (2007)

WThe Wackness (2008)The Waiting Game (1999)Waking the Dead (2000)The Walk (2015)Wall Street (1987)Watchmen (2009)We Married Margo (2000)We Own the Night (2007)Weapons of Mass Distraction (1997)The Wedding Banquet (1993)Weekend at Bernie's (1989)Weekend at Bernie's II (1993)We're Back! A Dinosaur's Story (1993)West New York (1996)The West Side Waltz (1995)When Harry Met Sally... (1989)While You Were Sleeping (1995)Whipped (2000)Whispers in the Dark (1992)White Hot (1988)White Water Summer (1987)Who's That Girl? (1987)Wigstock (1995)Willie Dynamite (1973)Winged Migration (2001)The Wiz (1978)Wolf (1994)Wolfen (1981)Woo (1998)Working Girl (1988)World Trade Center (2006)World Traveler (2001)Wrong is Right (1982) (includes CIA planting a nuclear bomb on top of Twin Towers and blaming terrorists for it)

XX-Men (2000)Xchange (2001)X-Men: Days of Future Past (2014)X-Men: Apocalypse (2016)

YYear of the Dragon (1985)You Stupid Man (2002)Yeah Right! (2003)

ZZombie (1979)Zoolander (2001)

Detailed appearances

Notable movie posters
 Godzilla vs. Megalon (1973) – In the American theatrical poster it shows Godzilla and Megalon fighting on top of the Twin Towers of the World Trade Center. In the actual film, no scenes take place in New York City, nor in the United States at all; rather, the poster's artwork was simply created in an attempt to duplicate the artwork used for the 1976 King Kong remake's posters.
 Home Alone 2: Lost in New York (1992) – The Twin Towers can be seen in the logo.
 King Kong (1976) – Kong is shown atop the Twin Towers with one foot on each tower, grasping a burning fighter plane as other planes attack.
 Manhattan (1979) – Both towers make up the two legs of the "H" of the title "MANHATTAN".
 New York Stories (1989) – The poster shows a small apartment building with various people in each window, behind is the title and only the Twin Towers. They were removed in the 2003 DVD release.
 Sidewalks of New York (2001) – The poster showed the World Trade Center in the background; the poster had to be changed, delaying the movie's release.
 Spider-Man (2002) – Seen in Spider-Man's eyes in the pre-9/11 teaser poster. The poster is still at large, and now is a highly prized collector's item.
 Splash (1984) – Seen in the background of the original poster. In the 2004 anniversary edition, it is changed to a view of the Empire State Building.
 The Manhattan Dating Project (2001) – Seen throughout the film in the background and on the original poster. Later it has been replaced by the Singer Sha Sabi posing in front of a Limousine and the Empire State Building.
 The Squeeze (1987) – The main character is actually being "squeezed" in between the two towers with a large hand.
 Superman II (1980) – Both versions of the poster include the World Trade Center with the New York City skyline on fire, or in this case Metropolis.
 Hellraiser III: Hell on Earth (1992) – The Twin Towers can be seen in the background of the theatrical release poster.
 Antz'' (1998) – The Twin Towers are seen in the bottom right corner of the poster. They also are on the VHS poster.

References

External links
World Trade Center in Movies
See the Twin Towers rise again in movie clips
World Trade Center Remembered In Movies

Lists of films by common content
Lists of films by setting
Lists of films by topic
Film